Condeellum is a genus of proturans in the family Protentomidae, found in Subtropical China, Pacific Islands, Tropical Asia, and the island of Réunion.

Species
 Condeellum crucis Tuxen & Imadaté, 1975
 Condeellum ishiianum Imadaté, 1965
 Condeellum jinghongense Tuxen & Yin, 1982
 Condeellum regale (Condé, 1958)

References

Protura